The women's triple jump event at the 2009 European Athletics U23 Championships was held in Kaunas, Lithuania, at S. Dariaus ir S. Girėno stadionas (Darius and Girėnas Stadium) on 16 and 17 July.

Medalists

Results

Final
17 July

Qualifications
16 July
Qualifying 13.65 or 12 best to the Final

Group A

Group B

Participation
According to an unofficial count, 20 athletes from 15 countries participated in the event.

 (1)
 (1)
 (2)
 (1)
 (1)
 (1)
 (1)
 (3)
 (2)
 (1)
 (1)
 (2)
 (1)
 (1)
 (1)

References

Triple jump
Triple jump at the European Athletics U23 Championships